The 2018 Japan Open was the sixth event of the 2018 ITTF World Tour. It took place from 8–10 June in Kitakyushu, Japan.

Men's singles

Seeds

Draw

Top half

Bottom half

Finals

Women's singles

Seeds

Draw

Top half

Bottom half

Finals

Men's doubles

Seeds

Draw

Women's doubles

Seeds

Draw

Mixed doubles

Seeds

Draw

References

External links
Tournament page on ITTF website

Japan Open
Japan Open
Sports competitions in Kitakyushu
Table tennis competitions in Japan
International sports competitions hosted by Japan
Japan Open